The Chapel of St Demetrius, more commonly known as San Dimitri Chapel, is a small rural Roman Catholic church located in Għarb, Gozo, Malta. This is the only church in Malta dedicated to this Greek saint.

Mediaeval chapel
The original chapel was built by Reverend Franġisk Depena sometime in the 15th century. The chapel was mentioned in inquisitor Pietro Dusina's 1575 report of his visit to the chapel. However, during the pastoral visit of Bishop Balaguer in on May 24, 1657, the church was deconsecrated due to its dilapidated state.

Early modern chapel
In 1736 the chapel was rebuilt by the initiative of Reverend Mario Vella. The new chapel was blessed on the 11th of April, 1809 by the Archpriest of Għarb the Reverend Publio Refalo who represented the Bishop of Malta Ferdinando Mattei. A mass in the Byzantine rite was celebrated in the chapel by the parish priest of the Greek community of Malta Papas Schirò at the start of WWII by the initiative of the rector Reverend Paul Formosa. The chapel was fully restored in 2012 and inaugurated on February 3, 2013. A feast in honor of St Demetrius is celebrated every year on the Sundays closest to October 8.

Interior
The main painting depicting St Demetrius dressed as a soldier on a horse with an old woman pleading with him on one side while a young man in chains is depicted on the other side. This painting represents a local legend which is narrated further below. The painting dates from 1810 and the painter is unknown. It was restored in 1937 by Wistin Camilleri. There are 2 other paintings on each side of the main altar, one representing St Aristarchus and the other the Assumption of Mary. Other paintings depicts the martyrdom of St Demetrius and another of St Paul.

Legend
The legend states that an old woman named Natalizia Cauchi nicknamed Żgugina, had one son named Mattew. One time the corsairs attacked her home in Għarb and took her only son as a slave with them. She went to pray to St Demetrius in the chapel. Żgugina told St Demetrius that if he brought back her son she would light an oil lamp everyday in the chapel. At that very moment St Demetrius went out of the painting riding his horse. St Demetrius went on the pirate ship and took Mattew with him back to his mother. After this Demetrius reentered his portrait however, legend says that his horse left an imprint on the walls of the chapel. This legend explains the reason for the depictions in the painting of St Demetrius described above.
 
Another legend, which complements the previous one, states that the chapel was built near the cliffs and one day a big earthquake hit the island and as a result the chapel toppled into the sea without breaking however the chapel itself did not break. The legend says that fishermen have seen Żguigina's oil lamp still burning on the bottom of the sea floor.

References

18th-century Roman Catholic church buildings in Malta
Għarb
National Inventory of the Cultural Property of the Maltese Islands